Keith Creel (born 1968) is the President and Chief Executive Officer of Canadian Pacific Railway (CPR).

Earlier career
Creel was born in Alabama. He served as a commissioned officer in the United States Army and took part in the Gulf War. He took a degree in marketing at Jacksonville State University, and attended the six-week Advanced Management Program at Harvard Business School. Upon graduation in 1992 he joined Burlington Northern Railroad as an operations manager, at first in Birmingham, Alabama. In 1996 he joined the Illinois Central Railroad, which later merged with Canadian National Railway (CN), and in 1999 became general manager of the Michigan Zone within the Midwest Division of Grand Trunk Western (GTW). He moved to Canada in 2002 as vice president of CN's Prairie Division in Winnipeg, and successively took the posts of senior VP of the western region, senior VP of the eastern region, executive VP (2007), and Chief Operating Officer (2010).  He merged GTW and two other railroads within CN, and pursued a system of "precision railroading" using fewer trains but ensuring that they run fast and on time.

Canadian Pacific
Creel moved to CPR, as President and Chief Operating Officer, in early 2013. He received the Progressive Railroading Railroad Innovator Award for 2014, in recognition of outstanding achievements in the rail industry. He deputized for Chief Executive Hunter Harrison on several occasions, and succeeded Harrison as Chief Executive in January 2017, earlier than the originally planned handover date of July 2017. As CEO he has made efforts to improve services and attract more customers, and to improve relations between company and workforce after earlier staff cuts.

In 2020, industry trade journal Railway Age named Creel Railroader of the Year for 2021 and 2022.

References

Living people
1968 births
20th-century American railroad executives
21st-century American railroad executives
Businesspeople from Alabama
Canadian National Railway executives
Canadian Pacific Railway executives
Illinois Central Railroad people
Jacksonville State University alumni